Personal, social, health and economic education is a school curriculum subject in England that focuses on strengthening the knowledge, skills, and connections to keep children and young people healthy and safe and prepare them for life and work. PSHE education is defined by the schools inspectorate Ofsted as a planned programme to help children and young people develop fully as individuals and as members of families and social and economic communities. Its goal is to equip young people with the knowledge, understanding, attitudes and practical skills to live healthily, safely, productively and responsibly.

The Department for Education state that "all schools should make a plan for PSHE, drawing on good practice"  and that PSHE education is "an important and necessary part of all pupils' education".

PSHE learning is shown to not only support pupils' health, relationships and wellbeing but also their academic attainment. A DfE review of PSHE education provision found a range of positive outcomes, including improved attitudes to health, being able to deal with personal difficulties and improved behaviour.

In Wales, the subject is personal and social education. In Ireland (ROI), it is social, personal, and health education. It is also known as personal, social, health and economic education; personal, social and emotional development; and personal, social, health and citizenship education.

PSHE is currently the responsibility of the Minister of State for Schools.

PSHE themes and topics
The PSHE education programme of study is organised into three core themes:
 health and well-being
 relationships
 living in the wider world (covering economic well-being and careers)

These themes include numerous topics linked to physical and mental health, alcohol and drug culture, sex, and relationships, education, economic well-being, and careers.

Status on the curriculum
PSHE education has been a non-statutory (and therefore non-compulsory) curriculum subject. However, as Ofsted stated in its 2013 PSHE report "the great majority of schools choose to teach it because it makes a major contribution to their statutory responsibilities to promote children and young people's personal and economic wellbeing; offer sex and relationships education; prepare pupils for adult life and provide a broad and balanced curriculum".

There have however been concerns raised about the consistency of provision due to this non-statutory status. The aforementioned 2013 Ofsted PSHE report found that 40% of schools’ PSHE education was "not yet good enough". There has also been more of an expectation on independent schools to provide PSHE education than maintained schools and academies up to now due to greater emphasis on PSHE in the Independent Schools Standards.

Concerns over consistency and quality and provision prompted a national campaign to raise the status of PSHE education in all schools. This was supported by over 100 organisations (including the NSPCC, British Heart Foundation, Teenage Cancer Trust and Barnardo's), 85% of business leaders, 88% of teachers, 92% of parents and 92% of young people.

In 2017 the government committed to introducing compulsory relationships and sex education (RSE) in all secondary schools, and compulsory 'relationships education' in all primary schools. An additional commitment to the health education (mental and physical) aspect of PSHE education was announced in July 2018. The majority of PSHE education will therefore be compulsory in all schools from September 2020. Though not yet compulsory, schools are still expected to cover the economic wellbeing (and careers) of PSHE education.

The PSHE Association and the Sex Education Forum jointly published a 'Roadmap to Statutory RSE education' in November 2018 to support schools in preparing their relationships and sex education for statutory changes.  In February 2019, the Department of Education enacted a statutory guidance policy which will assist schools in England with PSHE when it becomes compulsory in 2020.

A measure to make PSHE compulsory in primary and secondary schools in England received approval from the House of Lords in April 2019. The Department for Education (DfE) published final statutory guidance for teaching Relationships Education, Relationships and Sex Education (RSE) and Health Education in June 2019. The consultation closed in November 2018. This guidance will replace existing government "Sex and Relationship Education Guidance", which were last updated in 2000. The guidelines, which were also published by the House of Commons, require, among other things, acknowledgement of England's laws concerning gay rights, including the legalization of same-sex marriage and the protection of the "physical and mental wellbeing" of gay children.

Despite not being mandatory until September 2020, schools in England were encouraged to enact the new PSHE curriculum starting in September 2019. In September 2020, the PSHE curriculum went into effect in England's high schools and elementary schools. with high schools also adapting LGBT PSHE sex education.

National body for PSHE education  
The PSHE Association is the national body for PSHE education in England, providing advice and support to a network of over 50,000 teachers and other professionals working in schools nationwide. The association is an independent charity and membership association, established as the official national PSHE subject association by the Department for Education in 2007.

Publications 

There are many independent publications supporting the teaching of PSHE education in schools in the UK:
Programme of Study for PSHE Education (Key stages 1–5), 2020, by the PSHE Association
 A curriculum for life: the case for statutory PSHE education, by the PSHE Association
 Key principles for statutory PSHE, by the PSHE Association
Understanding Personal, Social, Health and Economic Education in Primary Schools by Nick Boddington, Adrian King, Jenny McWhirter
Understanding Personal, Social, Health and Economic Education in Secondary Schools by Jenny McWhirter, Nick Boddington, Jenny Barksfield
 Jigsaw PSHE Scheme of Work by Jan Lever and Clare Williams
 Circles, PSHE and Citizenship in Secondary Schools by Marilyn Tew, Hilary Potter and Mary Read
 PSHE and Citizenship by Hilary Mason
 The PSHE Co-Ordinator's Handbook by Colin Noble, Graham Hofmann
 Dimensions Creative Curriculum PSHE schemes of work Nursery EYFS, KS1, KS2 by Elaine Sutton

See also 
 Stand Against Violence

References

External links 
 PSHE Association Subject association for professionals working in PSHE education.
 Coram Life Education  PSHE resources for schools. 

Health education in the United Kingdom
Education in England
Medical education in the United Kingdom